The Citroën GS Camargue was a concept car based on the Citroën GS, presented as a two-door coupé with 2+2 seating. It was designed by the Italian company Bertone. It used GS mechanical components, and was the same overall length, but  wider.

It was presented in 1972 at the Geneva Motor Show.

Historically, this is the first collaboration between Bertone and Citroën, which later produced the successful BX.

See also
 Camargue

References

External links

GS Camargue
Bertone concept vehicles

fr:Citroën GS Camargue